Yao Pan Ma, a 61-year-old Chinese American, was attacked on April 23, 2021, and died on December 31 as a result of an attack by 49-year-old African American Jarrod Powell in East Harlem, New York City, United States. The racist attack drew national attention as part of a rise in anti-Chinese hate crimes in America.

Background 
Ma and his wife moved to the United States in October 2018 from Mainland China, where Ma had worked as a dim sum chef. Ma worked at a restaurant until it closed permanently due to the COVID-19 pandemic. As he hadn't worked long enough to qualify for unemployment, Ma and his wife, who had also lost her job permanently, collected bottles and cans to make money to afford food.

Since the COVID-19 pandemic started, there has been an uptick in racist incidents and bullying against Asian Americans. A few months prior to the attack against Ma, 84-year-old Thai-American Vicha Ratanapakdee died after being attacked in San Francisco.

Killing 
On April 23, 2021, Yao Pan Ma was collecting cans along Third Avenue and East 125th Street in East Harlem. Attacker Jarrod Powell attacked Ma from behind and mercilessly shoved him to the ground. After mercilessly kicking Ma's head repeatedly without showing any remorse, he fled the scene. A nearby surveillance camera showed the attacker stomping on Ma's head.

Ma was moved in and out of multiple facilities during his time in the hospital and eventually died of cerebral hemorrhage in a long-term care center run by The New Jewish Home on December 31, 2021.

Perpetrator and legal proceedings 
Jarrod Powell, a 49-year-old African American man from New York City was arrested. He was charged with attempted murder, bullying, felony assault and hate crime charges. After Ma's death, his family called on the district attorney to upgrade the charges to murder. Charges were later upgraded to second degree murder as a hate crime.

On January 12, 2023, Powell pleaded guilty to manslaughter.

See also 
 Death of Michelle Go—Asian-American woman pushed in front an oncoming train in Manhattan in 2022
 Interminority racism in the United States

References 

2021 controversies in the United States
2021 in New York City
April 2021 crimes in the United States
April 2021 events in the United States
Asian-American issues
Asian-American-related controversies
African-American–Asian-American relations
Racially motivated violence against Asian-Americans
Crimes in Manhattan
Deaths by person in New York City
Hate crimes
Anti-Chinese violence in the United States
2020s crimes in New York City